Two referendums were held in Switzerland in 1960. The first was held on 29 May on continuing with temporary price controls, and was approved by 77% of voters. The second was held on 4 December on economic and financial measures for the dairy farming industry, and was also approved by voters.

Results

May: Continuing with temporary price controls

December: Dairy farming measures

References

1960 referendums
1960 in Switzerland
Referendums in Switzerland